A cream cake is a generic description of many varieties of cream-filled pastries.

More specifically cream cake may refer to:
 The Viennese Cremeschnitte, known in former Yugoslavia as a kremšnita / kremna rezina or krempita, a slice with a puff pastry base and custard cream.
 The mille-feuille, a cream filled French puff-pastry slice, also called vanilla slice, custard slice, and Napoleon,
 The kremówka or napoleonka, the Polish variant of the French pastry slice
 The tompouce, in Flemish and Dutch spelled tompoes, a slice cream cake of Belgium and the Netherlands
 Scandinavian cream cake, commonly called bløtkake (Norwegian bokmål), blautkake (Norwegian nynorsk), gräddtårta (Swedish), and flødeskumskage (Danish).

See also
Ice-cream cake